The Perry–Castañeda Library Map Collection is an extensive map collection owned by the Perry–Castañeda Library at The University of Texas at Austin.

Many of the maps in the collection have been scanned and are available online, and most of these maps are public domain.

The collection includes maps of special interest:
 Afghanistan
 Avian influenza
 Darfur Conflict
 Iran
 Iraq
 Korea
 Kuwait
 Somalia

General categories include:
 The World
 Africa
 The Americas
 Asia
 Australia and the Pacific
 Europe
 Middle East
 Polar Regions and Oceans
 Russia and the Former Soviet Republics
 United States including national parks and national monuments
 Texas
 Texas Counties
 Austin

References

External links 

 Online maps

Map collections
Libraries in Austin, Texas
Research libraries in the United States